Abū al-ʿAbbās Aḥmad ibn al-Hasan al-Mustaḍīʾ, better known by his  al-Nāṣir li-Dīn Allāh (6 August 1158 – 5 October 1225) or simply as al-Nasir, was the Abbasid caliph in Baghdad from 1180 until his death. His  literally can mean The One who Gives Victory to the Religion of God. He continued the efforts of his grandfather al-Muqtafi in restoring the caliphate to its ancient dominant role and achieved a surprising amount of success as his army even conquered parts of Iran. According to the historian, Angelika Hartmann, al-Nasir was the last effective Abbasid caliph.

In addition to his military success al-Nasir built many monuments in Baghdad that are still standing such as Zumurrud Khatun Mosque and Mausoleum.

Biography
Al-Nasir was the son of Caliph al-Mustadi and a Turkish umm walad called Zumurrud (Emerald). His reign was unusual for the rise of the futuwwa groups in his reign, connected to Baghdad's long-standing ayyarun. These urban social groups had long existed in Baghdad and elsewhere, and they were often involved in urban conflicts, especially sectarian riots. Al-Nasir made them into an instrument of his government, reorganizing them along Sufi lines and ideology.

In the early years of his caliphate, his goal was to crush the Seljuq power and replace it with his own. He incited rebellion against the Seljuq Sultan of Persia, Toghrul III. The Khwarezm Shah, Ala ad-Din Tekish, at his instigation, attacked the Seljuq forces, and defeated them in 1194; Toghrul was killed and his head exposed in the caliph's palace. Tekish, recognized now as supreme ruler of the East, bestowed on the caliph certain provinces of Persia that had been held by the Seljuqs.

Al-Nasir's mother Zumurrud died in December 1202–January 1203, or January–February 1203, and was buried in her own mausoleum in Sheikh Maarouf Cemetery. Her mausoleum is known as Zumurrud Khatun Mausoleum.

Al-Nasir sent his vizier to Tekish with some gifts, but the vizier irritated Tekish, who attacked the caliph's troops and routed them. Thereafter hostile relations prevailed for many years. The Caliph assassinated a governor of Tekish by using an Ismaili emissary. Tekish responded by having the body of al-Nasir's vizier, who died on a campaign against him, exhumed, and the head stuck up at Khwarizm. Irritated at this and other hostile acts, the Caliph retaliated by treating with indignity the pilgrims who came from the East under Khwarizm's flag. But beyond such poor revenge, he was powerless for any open enmity.

Tekish's son, Muhammad II (1200–1220), annoyed at the actions of the caliph, set up a Shi'a Caliph to paralyse al-Nasir's spiritual power. Following up this act, he turned his army on Baghdad. In response, some medieval historians write that al-Nasir appealed to Genghis Khan, the rising Mongol chief, to check Muhammad's progress. This point is controversial, but it is likely that the caliph had some contacts to the non-Muslims Mongols.

The caliph soon found Genghis Khan to be quite threatening. The steppes of Central Asia were set in motion by Genghis Khan, and his hordes put to flight the Khwarizm Shah, who died an exile in an island of the Caspian.

Policies and events
During the caliphate of al-Nasir several important political changes, incidents and developments took place. He also took part in them directly and sometimes indirectly.

Events between 1187–1190

In 1186 a conflict broke between sultan Toghrul III and Qizil Arslan. This conflict possibly prevented Toghrul III and Qizil Arslan from aiding Muhammad b. Bahram Shah, the last Seljuk Sultan of Kirman, who had been driven from Kirman by Oghuz rebels driven out from Khurasan in 1186

The rebel army consisted of the forces of the Amirs of Zenjan and Maragha, the retainers of both Kamal Ai-Aba, head of the Mamluks, and of Saif al-Din Rus, husband of Innach Khatun, while Toghrul himself received significant support from Turkmens, and their combined army forced Qizil Arslan to leave Hamadan after some clashes. Toghrul undertook two diplomatic ventures in 1187, he journeyed to Mazandaran to request aid from Bavandid Husam al-Daula Ardashir, and received troops from him, and Toghrul also sent messages to al-Nasir, asking him to restore the palace of the Seljuk Sultan in Baghdad for him, but the Caliph razed the palace and then sent aid to Qizil Arslan, who agreed to become the Caliph's vassal. The Caliph sent an army numbering 15,000 under his vizier Jalal al-Din 'Ubaidallah b. Yunus, which attacked Hamadan in 1188 without waiting for Qizil Arslan's army to arrive, he was defeated and captured, Toghrul secured victory by charging the enemy center after his right wing was battered, but this was a Pyrrhic victory, as Toghrul's army suffered grievous losses in the battle.  The Sultan next tried to reform his administration and coordinate strategy with available resources,  but his rash behavior regarding a dispute over the command of the army, led to the execution of Kamal Ai-Aba, Saifuddin Rus and several of the Sultan's opponents, and the desertion of his allies. 

Qizil Arslan had declared Sanjar b. Suleiman-Shah as the Seljuk Sultan of Iraq, and reinforced by troops sent by the Caliph now invaded Hamadan, Toghrul, unable to resist the invasion, first retreated to Isphahan,  then to Urmia. He was joined by an army led by his brother in law Hasan Kipchiq, and Toghrul also tried to get help from the Ayyubids and the Caliph, even sent his infant son as hostage to Baghdad in a futile gesture. Toghrul invaded Azerbaijan and sacked the towns of Ushnu, Khoy, Urmiya and Salmas.  Qizil Arslan reconciled with his nephews and defeated and captured Toghrul when he again invaded Azerbaijan in 1190. Qizli Arslan imprisoned Toghrul and his son Malik Shah in Kuhran fortress near Tabriz. Qizil Arslan, encouraged by the Caliph, soon declared himself Sultan, married Innach Khatun, his brother's widow, and was poisoned by her in September, 1191. His nephews began to rule independently, and one of the Mamluks of Jahan Pahalvan, Mahmud Anas Oglu, freed Toghrul III from his prison in May 1192.

Events of 1192–1194

Toghrul eluded the pursuers sent by Abu Bakr and quickly assembled an army from his supporters and Turkmens, then marched east and defeated the army of Qutlugh Inanch Muhammad and Amir Amiran Umar near Qazvin on June 22, 1192, and won over a large part of the enemy soldiers after his victory. Qutlug-Inach and Amiran Omar then attacked Abu Bakr in Azerbaijan and was beaten, Aimiran Umar sought refuge with his father in law Shirvanshah Akhsitan I (1160-1196), while Qutlug-Inach moved to Rey. Toghrul occupied Hamadan, secured the treasury and came to rule over Isphahan and Jibal, but did not attempt to negotiate an agreement with Abu Bakr, against Qutlug Innach. Qutlugh Innach now appealed to Khwarazmshah Ala ad-Din Tekish for aid, and Tekish invaded and captured Rey in 1192, forcing Qutlug Innach to flee the city.

Toghrul's Truce with Tekish
Sultan Toghrul III opened negotiations with Tekish, and eventually agreed to become a vassal of Khwarizm, marriage of his daughter The Tekish's son Yunus Khan, and in return Tekish kept Rey, garrisoned his newly acquired territory, collected taxes, then installed Tamghach as the governor, and returned home to quell the rebellion of his brother Sultan Shah. Toghrul now had the chance to negotiate with the Atabeg of Yazd, Langar ibn Wardanruz, or the Salghurid ruler of Fars, Degle ibn Zangi, both were nominally loyal to the Seljuks but no initiatives were taken to unite against their common enemy.

Breaking of Truce and War declaration of Tekish and al-Nasir
Toghrul felt threatened with the presence of a hostile force in Rey, which was a strategic town commanding communication with Jibal and Azerbaijan was unacceptable to the Sultan. The Sultan marched towards Rey with his available forces in March 1193, defeated and killed Tamghach, captured Rey and drove out the Khrarizmian forces from the province. Toghrul III next married Innach Khatun, mother of Qutlug Innach and Amirin Umar, as part of the peace agreement on her request, however, she was executed after the discovery of a plot to poison the Sultan. The Sultan returned to Hamadan, Qutlug Innach fled to Zanjan, from where he sent messages to Tekish, and al-Nasir also asked the Tekish to move against Toghrul. Toghrul again moved east in 1194 and defeated Qutlug Innach in battle despite the presence of 7,000 Khwarazmian troops aiding Qutlug Innach. Qutlug Innach and other survivors moved east and joined up with the main Khwarizmian army led by Shah Tekish at Semnan.

Tughril was defeated in the battle of Ray by Tekish with the help of al-Nasir. Ala ad-Din Tekish sent Toghrul's head to al-Nasir who displayed it at the Nubi Gate in front of his palace, while his body was hanged at Rey.

His Rejection of Khwarezmid's claim
By 1217, Muhammad had conquered all the lands from the river Jaxartes to the Gulf. He declared himself shah and demanded formal recognition from the caliph. When the caliph al-Nasir rejected his claim, Ala ad-Din Muhammad gathered an army and marched towards Baghdad to depose al-Nasir. However, when crossing the Zagros Mountains, the shah's army was caught in a blizzard. Thousands of warriors died. With the army decimated, the generals had no choice but to return home.

Death
Al-Nasir spent his last three years paralysed and nearly blind. He suffered from dysentery for twenty days and then died.
He was succeeded by his son al-Zahir in the year 1225 as the thirty-fifth Abbasid caliph. His son ruled for a short period, al-Zahir lowered the taxes, and built a strong army to resist invasions. He died on 10 July 1226, nine months after his accession. He was succeeded his son (al-Nasir's grandson) al-Mustansir.

See also
 al-Sarai Mosque
 Shihab al-Din 'Umar al-Suhrawardi designated as Shaykh al-Islam by al-Nasir.
 Baghdad School also known as the Arab school was an influential school of Islamic art developed during the late 12th century in the Abbasid capital Baghdad.

References

Sources 
 
 
 
 
 
 
 
 This text is partly adapted from William Muir's public domain, The Caliphate: Its Rise, Decline, and Fall.
 Hartmann, Angelika. An-Nasir li-Din Allah: Politik, Religion und Kultur in der späten Abbasidenzeit.

1158 births
1225 deaths
Arab Muslims
12th-century Abbasid caliphs
13th-century Abbasid caliphs
Muslims of the Third Crusade
Muslims of the Fifth Crusade
Shafi'is
Sons of Abbasid caliphs